Inhapim is a city in Minas Gerais, Brazil. Its population was 24,079 (2020) and its area is 858 km².

See also
List of municipalities in Minas Gerais

References

Municipalities in Minas Gerais